ross. is the fourth studio album by the musical project Low Roar, released in November 2019 through Paper Records.

Track listing

References

External links 
 Official website

2019 albums
Low Roar albums